This is a list of prisons in Yunnan province of the People's Republic of China.

Sources 

Prisons
Yunnan